Agnippe conjugella is a moth of the family Gelechiidae. It is found in Afghanistan, northern Iran, south-eastern Kazakhstan, Uzbekistan, Turkmenistan, Kyrgyzstan and China (Ningxia).

The wingspan is 7.5–8.7 mm. The forewings have a black or dark-brown basal patch, with two connected black spots. The hindwings are light grey. Adults are on wing from May to September in at least three generations.

The larvae feed on the leaves of Alhagi sparsifolia, which are held together by silk spun by the larvae. Full grown larvae reach a length of 5–6 mm. They are pale yellow. The species overwinters in the pupal stage.

References

Moths described in 1920
Agnippe
Moths of Asia